Vehicle registration plates of Kosovo are issued by the Ministry of Internal Affairs of the Republic of Kosovo. As of June 1, 2012, all residents of Kosovo are obliged to fit their cars with KS or RKS plates. Non-compliance results in confiscation of the non-Kosovan plates (including Serbian plates with district codes for claimed Kosovo districts) and legal charges.

Numbering and lettering 
On 6 December 2010, a new design was introduced containing the letters RKS (Republic of Kosovo's initials) on a blue field, a two digit number corresponding to the districts of Kosovo, the coat of arms of Kosovo, a three-digit number and finally two serial letters. The three-digit number starts at 101 and the serial letters start at AA. The remaining plates bearing the old design issued under UNMIK will be replaced with the new once their registration is pending renewal. As of 26 December 2011, RKS plates will be substituted with temporary Serbian plates when crossing the contested border into Serbia.

Plates of vehicles, trailers and motorcycles
Horizontal plates of vehicles should be white retro – reflecting coloured, numbers and letters black coloured, while the frame should be black coloured with 4 mm width. In all horizontal plates, in the first horizontal part of the plate that is blue coloured, is placed the code of the Republic of Kosovo, RKS, with gold colour. In the second part of the plate are marked figures of the respective region.

Further, there should be the state emblem, three digit numbers, and then the horizontal line. In the end of the plate are marked two letters of the standard Latin
alphabet from A to the letter Q. Three digit numbers for ordinary, horizontal and quadrate plates of registration of the vehicles will be initiated from number 101.

Special plates
Export vehicle plates have blue background and white font.
Police vehicles have red font.
Kosovo Security Force has dark green background and yellow font, letters "FSK", a three-digit number and then a two-digit number.
EULEX diplomatic plates had black and white background. Black plates had the prefix "EU" and suffix "PV", while the white plates had the prefix "EU" and suffix "LEX".
OSCE plates are black and white, with the prefix "OSCE".
NATO Force plates have blue background, white font and prefix "KFOR".
UNMIK plates have "UNMIK" in top on the plate, followed by numbers.

UNMIK-era KS plates
These plates were issued under the administration of UNMIK from 1999 to 2010. Effective 1 November 2011, they will resume to be issued for citizens needing to cross into Serbia, as the latter only accepts these plates and not the new RKS plates. They consist of a three-digit number and a two-letter abbreviation KS, which stands for 'Kosovo', and ended in another three-digit number.

Gallery

Notes and references
Notes:

References:

External links

 License Plates of Kosovo
 International Missions Plates in Kosovo
 Registracija vozila

Road transport in Kosovo
Kosovo
Kosovo-related lists